Nalla Thambi is a 1985 Indian Tamil-language film, directed by S. P. Muthuraman and produced by AVM Productions, starring Karthik and Radha. It was released on 14 January 1985.

Plot 

Raja is a young man who has completed his MBA from the United States. On returning home, he discovers that all the young women in the city are eagerly waiting in his house, for him to marry one among them. However, though all the girls fail to impress Raja, Seetha manages to win the heart of his father, Chandrashekhar, who promises her in marriage to him. Overjoyed, Seetha gears up for the wedding, but has crooked plans in her heart. Raja discovers that she is not really an admirable person, but is forced to marry her because of his father's coercing. However, his mother secretly helps him elope from home and eventually the wedding is called off.

Raja runs into Chitra, a free-spirited girl who is being pressured by her three freakish "suitor" relatives to marry one among them. She requests Raja to act as her boyfriend so that her quirky suitors will back off in their pointless endeavor. Raja agrees and stays in her house, much to the dismay of her suitors. How they really fall in love and unite despite the hilarious obstacles that come their way, is what makes the movie an out-and-out comedy entertainer.

Cast 
Karthik as Raju
Radha as Chitra
T. S. B. K. Moulee as Chandrasekhar
Manorama as Raju's mother
V. S. Raghavan as Raghavan
Anuradha as Seetha/Julie
Senthil as Naidhu
Y. G. Mahendran
Kuladeivam V. R. Rajagopal

Production 
During the making of director S. P. Muthuraman's Nallavanukku Nallavan (1984), producer M. Saravanan promised to cast Karthik as the lead actor in a future film by the same director studio AVM Productions; that became Nalla Thambi.

Soundtrack 
The music was composed by Ilaiyaraaja, with lyrics written by Vaali, Gangai Amaran and Vairamuthu.

Reception
Jayamanmadhan of Kalki wrote the film which starts in a funny manner fearing it would become a laughing stock turns serious in second half by adding elements like murder, it becomes unintentionally funny when the film ends humorously.

References

External links 

1980s Tamil-language films
1985 films
AVM Productions films
Films directed by S. P. Muthuraman
Films scored by Ilaiyaraaja
Films with screenplays by Panchu Arunachalam